Blanche Swansted or Swanstead was a hairdresser and tirewoman to Elizabeth I, Anne of Denmark, and Princess Elizabeth.

A tire was a dressing for hair including a wire frame, jewels, and ribbons. Much of what is known about Blanche Swansted comes from the petitions she wrote for payment following the death of Anne of Denmark in 1619 and in 1620s. She had been a tirewoman to Princess Elizabeth and had a fee of 2 shillings daily.

A petition in The National Archives gives more information on her career. At the Union of Crowns in 1603, James VI and I travelled to London from Scotland, leaving Anne of Denmark and his children in Scotland. In April 1603 he ordered that some of Elizabeth's jewels, and a hairdresser, Blanche Swansted, should be sent to Berwick-upon-Tweed so that Anne of Denmark would appear like an English queen as she crossed the border. James reiterated this request, explaining the jewels were to be selected by Elizabeth's household attendants for Anne's "ordinary apparelling and ornament". Swansted's petition for payment explains that she had travelled north to meet the new queen and joined her service as "tirewoman in ordinary".

This development was probably a disappointment for Anne of Denmark's Scottish "attire-maker" James Taylor, whose appointment to the role was confirmed on 17 May 1603 in Edinburgh.

A young Scottish woman in Princess Elizabeth's household in England, probably Anne Livingstone, kept an account book. She wore the same hairstyles as the Princess, and bought "a tire of pearl to wear on my head", "a wire to my head with nine peaks" and, "a periwig of hair to cover the wire" and, "a French wire to my head with an hoop of hair". She paid for "dressings" to be made up with emeralds, pearls, garnets, green silk and feathers. The pearls and precious stones were her own. Swansted or another tire-maker got between 9 and 20 shillings for making these dressings, depending on how much material they added and sold. Swansted's annual wage in Princess Elizabeth's household was £9-2s-6d.

In December 1617 the Venetian ambassador Piero Contarini described the appearance of Anne of Denmark at Somerset House. Her hair was dressed with diamonds and other jewels and was extended in rays, or like the petals of a sunflower, with artificial hair.

References

Court of James VI and I
British hairdressers
Household of Elizabeth Stuart, Queen of Bohemia
Material culture of royal courts